Cat massage is a practice used by pet owners to maintain healthy circulatory systems and joints in felines.

Benefits
Touching, petting, and stroking a cat can stimulate the release of chemicals called cytokines, which signal the brain to release endorphins.

Massage therapy may have similar benefits for cats as it has for humans, including relief for any pain or anxiety the pet might be enduring. Cat massage is also seen as a preventative health measure for the animal. Additionally, cat massages may lower the blood pressure of the owner performing the massage, thus acting as a relaxation technique for both parties. Cat massage is useful in developing a bond between cat owners and their feline companions.

Massaging the cat may also help locate abnormalities on the cat's skin, as well as areas of tenderness or swelling that could be symptomatic of a serious condition.

Massage can increase mobility and flexibility in cats who suffer from arthritis. It may also be an alternative way to hasten the rehabilitation of a cat that has undergone surgery. Massage therapy may have a positive impact on the cat's digestive system, as well as their coat and skin.

Drawbacks
Although massage therapy can be highly recommended for cats, cat owners are recommended to avoid massaging cats that are feverish or those who have cancer. 

Massage should not be performed over open wounds, around unstable fractures, or when a cat is experiencing pain that is not yet appropriately controlled. Massage should be performed with caution on cats with blood-clotting conditions, and massage should not be performed directly over tumors.

A cat that becomes agitated during a massage may bite or scratch, which can be associated with dangerous infections, such as cat-scratch disease, Pasteurella multocida, and tenosynovitis, depending on the location and depth of injuries.

Techniques
Stroking the cat is an effective way to check for skin abnormalities or parasites. Owners should consider the likes and dislikes of their cat during the entire massage. Cats should not be forced into having massages, as this will increase stress and agitation. A common place to start is behind the ears, as cats may be more receptive to receiving affection in this area. Areas, where the cat has shown antipathy toward being petted, should be avoided.

Pet owners are advised to apply gentle massages to their cats, and if they wish to give their pet a deeper massage, they should have a professional demonstrate proper technique before applying it at home.

Effleurage and friction are both efficient techniques of massaging cats. 

 After the cat has shown that it is relaxed, the owner may start to pet it from head to tail, using an open and relaxed hand. This is the effleurage technique. The effleurage stroke is helpful in stimulating blood circulation and warming up the tissue.
 Circular friction may be performed on the cat's body by using one's fingertip to draw small circles on its skin, including the tail.

Cultural references 
Maryjean Ballner created a cat massage instructional book and VHS in the 1990s. A video blog website called Everything Is Terrible! took footage from Ballner's cat massage VHS, and created an edited version with highlights from the video. The edited version was then uploaded to YouTube in 2009 by user WrongMan, and has received over 4 million views to date. David Letterman interviewed Ballner in 2009 following the viral reception of the YouTube video.

References

External links
 Video demonstration

Cat health
Massage